Corvus Corax may refer to:

 Common raven (Corvus corax), bird
 Corvus Corax (band), German band known for playing medieval music
 Corvus Corax, the Primarch of the Raven Guard Space Marines in Warhammer 40,000